Sisonke Mazele (born 10 May 1999) is a South African cricketer. He made his Twenty20 debut for Western Province in the 2019–20 CSA Provincial T20 Cup on 13 September 2019. He made his List A debut on 19 October 2019, for Western Province in the 2019–20 CSA Provincial One-Day Challenge. He made his first-class debut on 24 October 2019, for Western Province in the 2019–20 CSA 3-Day Provincial Cup.

References

External links
 

1999 births
Living people
South African cricketers
Western Province cricketers
Place of birth missing (living people)